Taylan Aydoğan (born 27 May 1983 in Aachen, West Germany) is a German former football goalkeeper.

Club career

He became professional in Fenerbahçe. Taylan joined in Roda JC at the beginning of the season 2001/2002. He played for youth and reserves teams of this club.

Taylan transferred to Malatyaspor in 2004. He made his debut for Malatyaspor on February 22, 2006 in the Turkish Cup game against Giresunspor. Taylan also played for Kocaelispor and İzmirspor on loan. Taylan moved to Yeni Malatyaspor in 2010, but played very infrequently.

At the beginning of the 2011/12 season, Taylan signed a contract with Kahramanmaraşspor. Currently, he plays in the TFF Second League for this club. He is the captain of Kahramanmaraşspor.

References

External links
 Stats at rodajcspelers.nl
 
 Profile at fupa.net

1983 births
Living people
German footballers
Turkish footballers
German people of Turkish descent
Association football goalkeepers
İzmirspor footballers
Kocaelispor footballers
Malatyaspor footballers
Kahramanmaraşspor footballers
Yeni Malatyaspor footballers
Roda JC Kerkrade players
Fenerbahçe S.K. footballers
Hatayspor footballers
Tarsus Idman Yurdu footballers
Fethiyespor footballers
Denizli Belediyespor footballers
Sportspeople from Aachen
Footballers from North Rhine-Westphalia